Sav! The World Productions is a French production company, mainly active in the field of animation, formed in 1998 by writer-director Savin Yeatman-Eiffel. STW is also one of the rare Western companies to collaborate regularly with Japan, both artistically and financially.

STW is mainly known to the general public for its award-winning hit series Ōban Star-Racers (26 half-hours). Coproduced with Bandai Visual and Jetix Europe, Oban aired in more than 100 countries worldwide including ABC Family & Toon Disney (US), NHK BS1 & Disney Channel (Japan), France 3 (Fr.), ZDF and Super RTL (Germany), GMTV (UK), RAI2 (Italy) and Jetix/Disney XD. Nominated at the Bafta Awards, it won an Anime Land Award and a Grand Entertainment Prize at Polymanga. Iwasaki Taku and Yōko Kanno composed respectively the BGM and the credit songs.

STW has also produced  TV commercials and short films, exceptionally working on artistic development for third party companies (Zone of the Enders of Japanese studio Sunrise).

After a hiatus of a few years the company currently develops new animated series including a sequel and a spinoff of Ōban Star-Racers; as well as feature films projects: the historical epic The 2 Queens, developed under the helm of animation master Toshiyuki Inoue (Akira, Blood: The Last Vampire, Paprika, Giovanni's Island); and the live-action adaptations of Gen Urobuchi's cult visual novel Saya no Uta and of Argentinean playwright Claudio Tolcachir’s award-winning play The omission of the Coleman family (La omision de la familia Coleman).

Products
 Ōban Star-Racers (2006 TV series)

References

External links 

 
Oban Star-Racers official fansite

Anime companies
French animation studios